Vendetta is a 1989 beat 'em up video game released by System 3 for the Amstrad CPC, Commodore 64, and ZX Spectrum.

Plot 
A group of terrorists have kidnapped a professor and his daughter. The professor is working on a bomb. The terrorists make impossible demands and threaten to detonate a miniature nuclear weapon if the demands are not met. 

The protagonist, initially armed with only a knife, decides to rescue both individuals. Along the way, he collects other weapons and evidence to convince other police officers to let him continue his work, as he heads to an army base, a booby-trapped airplane, and finally central park, where the terrorists make the last stand.

Development 
Vendetta was based on the same rendering method and display used by The Last Ninja, but used a rewritten engine. This game engine was then used for the game Last Ninja 3.

Acclaim 
Vendetta received 93% from Zzap!64.

References 

1989 video games
Amstrad CPC games
Beat 'em ups
Commodore 64 games
Terrorism in fiction
Video games with isometric graphics
Video games developed in the United Kingdom
ZX Spectrum games